Poroi is a village and a community of the  Dio-Olympos municipality. Before the 2011 local government reform it was part of the municipality of East Olympos, of which it was a municipal district. The 2011 census recorded 770 inhabitants in the community. The community of Poroi covers an area of 26.889 km2.

Administrative division
The community of Poroi consists of three separate settlements: 
Agios Dimitrios (population 14)
Neoi Poroi (population 733)
Poroi (population 23)
The aforementioned population figures are as of 2011.

Village
The village Poroi (also Palaioi Poroi, to distinguish it from the larger Neoi Poroi) is a small mountain village with 23 inhabitants (2011). Author, member of the Filiki Eteria, and officer in the Greek War of Independence Christoforos Perraivos was born here. The village of Poroi contains numerous religious sites within the community. These include the chapels of St. Nikolaos and St. Dimitrios.

See also
 List of settlements in the Pieria regional unit

References

Populated places in Pieria (regional unit)